Heah Hock Aun, (15 January 1932-7 May 2014) is a former Malayan (Malaysian) badminton player, known for his accuracy and touch, who excelled internationally during the 1950s.

Early life 
Heah was born on 15 January 1932, in Penang, British Malaya. He was the son of Heah Joo Seang, a well-known rubber magnate, philanthropist and politician in Malaya.

Career 
Known as Johnny Heah while playing in Europe, he won men's singles at the Scottish Open in 1952, and was runner-up in men's singles to the celebrated Eddy Choong at the prestigious All-England Championships in 1953. His most notable badminton achievement was winning men's doubles at the 1957 All-England's with American Joe Alston, beating Eddy Choong and his brother David. Heah represented Malaya in the 1958 Thomas Cup (world team championship) Challenge Round, splitting his two doubles matches in Malaya's loss of the cup to Indonesia.

Personal life 
Heah married Amy Choong, cousin of the famous Malaya badminton players, David E. L. Choong and Eddy Choong, in 1955.

References 

1932 births
Malaysian people of Teochew descent
2014 deaths
People from Penang
Malaysian sportspeople of Chinese descent
Malaysian male badminton players